Jalan Parit Hamid–Parit Botak (Johor state route J9) is a major road in Johor, Malaysia

List of junctions

Roads in Johor